Sulpicio may refer to:
 Sulpicius (Sulpicio in Spanish), the Roman name
 Saint-Sulpice (disambiguation) (San Sulpicio)
 Sister San Sulpicio (disambiguation)
  ("Lord Sulpicio"), a Philippine passenger ferry
 Sulpicio Lines, a Philippine shipping line